Sheila Robinson (1925–1988) was a noted artist and illustrator, one of the Great Bardfield Artists and member of staff at the Royal College of Art. After her death, the RCA created the Sheila Robinson Drawing Prize in her honour.

Biography 
Sheila Robinson was born in Nottingham in 1925. She studied at the Nottingham School of Art and at the Royal College of Art, where she was a student of Edward Bawden. One of her RCA projects was a complete, hand-drawn, lettered and bound book, The Twelve Dancing Princesses. She married Bernard Cheese and moved to Thaxted, Essex, to raise their two children, one of whom is illustrator and printmaker Chloe Cheese. The marriage broke down, and she and the children moved to Great Bardfield in Essex, where she worked as part of a team with Edward Bawden on the Festival of Britain. She worked on a number of commercial commissions - advertising posters, including for BBC publications such as Time and Tune and the BBC Book of the Countryside. Robinson created several posters for London Transport in the early 1950s, including Literary London and Tattoo. She then taught at the Royal College of Art, and developed her work in printmaking and card-cut illustration. She was also one of the artists who contributed to The Oxford Illustrated Old Testament in the 1960s (along with Edward Ardizzone, Edward Bawden, Peter Blake, John Brathy, Edward Burra, David Hockney, Carel Weight and Brian Wildsmith. She died of a brain tumour in Saffron Walden in 1988.

Works 
 Illustrations for the boxed edition of D.H. Lawrence’s Sons and Lovers (Limited Editions Club of New York, 1975)
 Illustrations for The Oxford Illustrated Old Testament, 1960s
 Illustrations for the Festival of Britain.

The Sheila Robinson Drawing Prize 
This prize was established in her honour at the Royal College of Art. Recipients include:
 2013 - Anna Suwalowska
 2010 - Leah Fusco
 2010 - Rebecca Davies
 2009 - Zoe Taylor
 2006 - David Peter Kerr
 2003 - Daryl Waller
 2000 - Yu Rong
 Laura Carlin
 Yukki Yaura

References 

1925 births
1988 deaths
20th-century English women artists
Alumni of the Royal College of Art
Alumni of Nottingham School of Art
Artists from Nottingham
British women illustrators